Polo wraps are bandage materials, usually made of fleece, for a horse's legs. They can be quite stretchy compared to other bandaging materials, and are used mainly for protection during ridden work, longeing, and turnout.

Uses of polo wraps

Polo wraps can be used for many tasks and disciplines: they protect against minor scrapes and bruises and help prevent irritation from sand or arena footing. Usually, polos are used without any padding underneath. Some common activities polo wraps are used in include: 
 Riding. Polos may also be used while riding, most commonly on dressage horses or while schooling show hunters or show jumpers. The jumpers and equitation divisions permit the use of polos in competition, however, most riders opt for boots, as they provide better protection. 
 Longeing. Polos are also commonly used during longeing.
 Turnout. Some people turn their horses out in polos, although they must take care that the horse is not turned out in a wet pasture and that the polos are well secured.
 Shipping. Horses are sometimes shipped in polos for protection. However, shipping bandages or shipping boots provide much better protection, and are therefore preferable.

Applying polo wraps
There are several different ways to apply a polo wrap. The methods differ primarily in the location the wrapping is begun. Some people begin at the top of the leg and wrap down and then back up; others begin at the middle of the leg and wrap first one half and then the other. Wrapping styles also differ in whether the wrap extends, sling-like, beneath the fetlock joint. While the amount of support the sling affords the tendons and ligaments is debatable, it does provide a limited amount of protection to the joint from scrapes, bruises, and accidental overstep with the hind legs ("overreaching").

No matter how the wrap is applied, the tension in the wrap should be as uniform as possible across the entire leg. Uneven pressure may cause damage to tendons. Additionally, the pressure on one leg should be comparable to the pressure on leg on the other side; otherwise gait abnormalities may result. Conventional wisdom holds that because no two people wrap with exactly the same tension, the same person should wrap the right and left legs.

Advantages of polo wraps

Polos can be used for a horse who cannot wear boots (for example, a horse may be sensitive to neoprene, or have minor cuts on his leg that would be rubbed if a boot were worn). Polo wraps are often chosen for a horse whose legs are blemished with significant scar tissue that would prevent a boot from fitting properly. Unlike boots, polos conform perfectly to any leg, and may also be used on horses and ponies of any size, depending on the length. Many riders prefer polos due to the 'cleaner' look they provide. Lastly, polos usually cover a greater area of the leg than boots, and if the groom is experienced, may be customized to provide slightly more protection in one area of the leg.

Disadvantages of polo wraps
Perhaps the most notable disadvantage of polo wraps is their close proximity to the horse's tendons and ligaments; incorrect application (uneven distribution of tension, too tight, etc.) can damage the tendons. Polo wraps only stay on the leg as well as they are put on; if wrapped too loosely or the velcro is weak, you may be creating a potentially dangerous situation.

Polos are not suitable for use in potentially wet conditions (such as cross-country riding or riding through puddles), as they absorb water and become very heavy and sag. Also, polos are more time-consuming to apply than boots and need to be washed frequently to remove irritants like dried sweat or sand. Polos can also be pulled down and tighten around the tendons if a horse were to step on himself while wearing them.

Alternatives to polo wraps
Exercise bandages are a good alternative if the horse needs more protection and support. Brushing boots and galloping boots provide protection, and boots with neoprene can also provide support to the tendons and ligaments.

See also
Shipping bandage
Stable bandage
Brushing boots
Skid boots
Horse care
Puttee

Horse protective equipment